Happily Ever After is the sixth studio album by Hong Kong singer-songwriter G.E.M. The album was preceded by three EPs with three songs each, released in increments of two months between October and December 2019. The full physical album was released on 3 May 2019 following the controversies surrounding the legal disputes between G.E.M. and her label Hummingbird. The title of the separate EPs are taken from one of the b-side songs in each of the respective EPs.

The music video for the single "Tik Tok" reached 119 million views as of July 2022.

Background 
Following the success, and to support her first full Mandarin and fourth studio album Heartbeat, G.E.M. kicked off her third solo tour, "Queen of Hearts", on 1 April 2017 in Guangzhou, China. During the sold-out three-day concert schedule in Taiwan held on March, it was revealed by her agency that the singer will release a new album that summer. On 8 July, in celebration of her 10th anniversary, G.E.M. held a fan meeting in Guangzhou and confirmed additional details about the project, announcing that she will release a total of three EPs in a row, releasing one every two months starting August and that she will also release music videos.

Release

My Fairytale 
On 10 August 2018, G.E.M. released the music video for her single "Tik Tok" which was shot in Inner Mongolia, featuring Taiwanese actor Tender Huang. She performed the song on iQIYI's "Idol Hits" and shared the creative process that it only took three minutes for the song to be completed, claiming it to be "fate". The first out of three EPs from the project, My Fairytale, was released digitally on Chinese streaming platforms on 16 August and officially released worldwide on the 30th, with its lead single "Tik Tok" reaching 9 million views at that time. The cover for the EP was illustrated by Giselle Ukardi, an Instagram creator from Canada portraying G.E.M. as a realistic fairytale. According to G.E.M., the EP depicts her own fairytale that she found in real world.

Fearless 
On 12 October 2018, G.E.M. released the teaser for the second single "Woke", and announced on the 20th that the music video will be postponed and reshot. She followed with the second EP, Fearless, which was released digitally on Chinese streaming platforms on 26 October. The EP, along with the music video, was officially released worldwide on 9 November. The music video marked G.E.M.'s directorial debut, where she portrayed two characters, the white one depicts her crazy self, and the black one depicts love and self-discipline.

Queen G 
On 5 December 2018, G.E.M. released the teaser for the third single "Love Finds A Way", and released the official music video on the 7th which was shot in Taiwan, featuring Taiwanese actor Edison Song. According to G.E.M., the song employed flowers as a metaphor to a feeling that is not appreciated by people from the outside. She drew from her personal experiences of being a public figure that is often talked about by people, and realizing that the people around her are more important than those who are critical of her. The third and final EP, Queen G, was released on Chinese streaming platforms on 14 December. The EP was released worldwide on 28 December, along with the fan made video of her song "Queen G" which was uploaded on her official YouTube. The music video featured clips of her debut, live performances, and other behind-the-scenes to celebrate her 10th anniversary. It is the only song in the EP sung in Cantonese.

Legal disputes with Hummingbird Music 
On 7 March 2019, G.E.M. announced on her social media that she will be terminating her contract with Hummingbird Music. According to G.E.M., the company continued to violate her contractual rights even after multiple chances. Despite the contract termination, she made the decision to continue with the remaining eight stops for her ongoing concert, "Queen of Hearts", which she wrapped up in Kaohsiung on 28 April.

On 28 March, Hummingbird officially filed a lawsuit against G.E.M. regarding her contract. In the documents submitted, it was stated that G.E.M. initially signed a five-year contract in 2007 and renewing it in March 2012 for another five years. Three years before the end of the contract, Hummingbird claimed that the singer signed another renewal contract which was not dated but it was agreed upon that it will take effect in March 2017, making the contract's effective end date to be in March 2022. In the court documents, the company was also looking at claiming ownership of the singer's copyrighted works, along with her stage name.

On 5 April, G.E.M. filed a counter lawsuit, asking the court to not allow Hummingbird to take ownership of her work and trademark, along with an unspecified compensation amount.

On 3 May, Happily Ever After was released in Hong Kong under PCEP Company, Ltd., and on 10 May in Taiwan under Sony Music. Happily Ever After marked G.E.M.'s last studio album to be released under Hummingbird.

Track listing

Personnel 
Credits from the album's liner notes.

Musicians

 G.E.M.                                                   – vocals, background vocals 
 Gigi Worth                                                   – background vocals 
 Sam Vahdat                                                   – keys/synths & programming 
 Lupo Groinig                                                 – keys/synths & programming , guitar 
 Doug Petty                                                   – keys & programming , piano & B3 , piano & Moog , string arrangement 
 Aaron Sterling                                               – drums 
 Derek Frank                                                  – bass 
 Dan Petty                                                    – guitars 

Technical

 Tan Chang                                                    – executive producer, A&R, art direction
 Lupo Groinig                                                 – executive producer, A&R
 Giselle Ukardi                                               – graphic designer
 Kei Meguro                                                   – graphic designer
 Ilya Kuvshinov                                               – graphic designer
 Damon Tedesco                                                – engineering 
 Richard Furch                                                – mixing
 Reuben Cohen                                                 – mastering

References 

2019 albums
G.E.M. albums